Dunblane railway station serves the town of Dunblane in central Scotland. It is located on the former Scottish Central Railway, between Stirling and Perth and opened with the line in 1848. It is the northernmost station on the National Rail network to be electrified.

Facilities

These include those that terminate at Dunblane, which travel up the northbound line to the signal box to reverse & cross over to the southbound track before heading back down to the station. The signal box in question now operates only the points and signals here. As part of the now completed electrification, the semaphore signals formerly operated by the signal box within the sections electrified (i.e. not to the north of the station) have been replaced with single aspect electrical signals.

The station is staffed by one person who runs the ticket office and does most jobs around the station. Several plants have been placed around the station by a voluntary group known as 'Dunblane in Bloom'. 

 Passenger information system
 Automatic ticket machine (on Platform 1)
 Ticket office and waiting room (Mondays - Saturdays, a.m.)
 CCTV
 Waiting shelters and benches
 Limited car parking to the East
 Parking to the west in the former goods sidings area in conjunction with Tesco parking
 Help point

In September 2014, a new footbridge opened with improved accessibility, and the original footbridge removed. The listed footbridge was re-erected at the heritage Bridge of Dun railway station.

Services

The train operating company that serves Dunblane station is ScotRail. Trains generally leave for Edinburgh at 28 and 58 minutes past the hour, and for Glasgow Queen Street at 13 minutes past the hour, though this is supplemented by trains from the north. These trains serve all intermediate stations en route, whereas the services from further afield serve principal stations only.

On Sundays, there is a local hourly service to Edinburgh and hourly calls each way by the Aberdeen to Glasgow service, along with three Inverness to Glasgow (and vice versa) services. The southbound London North Eastern Railway service between Inverness and London King's Cross also stops here.

Train types
ScotRail trains serving Dunblane are made up of a variety of types, including DMUs, EMUs and ex-GWR 4 & 5 four carriage HST sets.

The Serco Caledonian Sleeper service from Inverness to London Euston, which is a double headed class 73 loco hauled rake of  Mk5 coaches.

The London North Eastern Railway that stops here once a day is operated by a  bi-mode unit. Southbound LNER trains switch from Diesel to Electric power at this station and vice versa for Northbound trains.

Dunblane, Doune and Callander Railway
Dunblane used to be a junction where the present line and the Dunblane, Doune and Callander Railway diverged. This connected at Callander to the Callander and Oban Railway. The line was axed in the Beeching cuts, being formally closed on 1 November 1965 (although traffic beyond Callander had ended five weeks earlier due to a landslide in Glen Ogle).

Parts of the trackbed from near Dunblane to Doune and from Callander to Killin are now cycle paths.

A short section of (unelectrified) track remains on the branch, and is used for storing track maintenance machines, or sometimes even a DMU.

See also
Dunblane Hotel, formerly the station's hotel

References

External links

Video footage of the station

Railway stations in Stirling (council area)
Former Caledonian Railway stations
Railway stations in Great Britain opened in 1848
Railway stations served by ScotRail
Railway stations served by Caledonian Sleeper
Listed buildings in Dunblane
William Tite railway stations
Listed railway stations in Scotland
Category C listed buildings in Stirling (council area)
Railway stations served by London North Eastern Railway